David Sheff (born December 23, 1955) is an American author of the books Beautiful Boy: A Father's Journey Through His Son's Addiction, Clean: Overcoming Addiction and Ending America's Greatest Tragedy, Game Over,The Buddhist on Death Row  and All We Are Saying: The Last Interview with John Lennon and Yoko Ono. He also writes for magazines and newspapers, including The New York Times, New York Times Magazine, Wired, Rolling Stone and other publications.

Early life and education
Sheff is originally from Boston, Massachusetts. His family is of Russian Jewish descent. He graduated from the University of California, Berkeley.

Career
Sheff, a journalist, wrote articles and conducted interviews for The New York Times, Rolling Stone, Playboy, Wired, Fortune, and National Public Radio's All Things Considered. His interview subjects have included John Lennon, Frank Zappa, Steve Jobs, Ai Weiwei, Keith Haring, David Hockney, Jack Nicholson, Ted Taylor, Carl Sagan, Betty Friedan, Barney Frank, and Fareed Zakaria, among others. In addition to Beautiful Boy, Sheff wrote the books Game Over, Clean: Overcoming Addiction and Ending America's Greatest Crisis, China Dawn, and All We Are Saying: The Last Major Interview with John Lennon and Yoko Ono. He has also been an editor of New West, California, and other magazines.

Beautiful Boy was based on Sheff's article, "My Addicted Son", that first appeared in the New York Times Magazine.

In January 2019, High: Everything You Want to Know About Drugs, Alcohol, and Addiction was published. A resource for middle-school readers offering clear, direct information about the realities of drugs and alcohol, it is Sheff and his son Nic's first collaborative project.

In 2019, Sheff founded the Beautiful Boy Fund, a charity devoted to making quality, evidence-based treatment for substance-use disorder accessible to those in need of treatment, and identifying and supporting research to further the field of addiction medicine.

Honors and awards 

In 2009, Sheff was included in Time magazine's Time 100 and on the magazine's World's Most Influential People list. Beautiful Boy won the Barnes & Noble "Discover Great New Writers Award" for nonfiction and was an Amazon Best Book of the Year in 2008. The article in which the book is based won an award for "Outstanding Contribution to Advancing the Understanding of Addictions" from the Society of Addiction Psychology.

He received media awards from College on Problems of Drug Dependence (CPDD), American Society of Addiction Medicine, the Partnership for Drug-free Kids, American College of Neuropsychopharmacology (ACNP), American Society of Addiction Medicine (ASAM), and was the first recipient of the American Academy of Addiction Psychiatry (AAAP) Arts and Literature Award.

Views on addiction

Sheff educates about addiction as a brain disease and is an advocate for putting addicts into therapy programs early.

He believes life stresses and traumas are risk factors, and that therapy for these can help addiction prevention. He is an advocate of life skills training to aid addiction prevention.

Personal life 
Sheff lives in Northern California with his wife, Karen Barbour, an artist, illustrator, and author of children's books. He has three children: Nic, Jasper, and Daisy Sheff. Nic Sheff, who has also written a memoir recounting his years of addiction in the book Tweak: Growing Up on Methamphetamines, is a writer for television and film. Jasper Sheff is a Grammy Award-nominated musician who has cowritten and produced songs for Lil Nas X, Elton John, Halsey and XXXTentacion. Daisy Sheff is an artist whose paintings have been exhibited at White Columns Gallery, Ratio 3, Clearing Gallery, Grimm Gallery  and elsewhere.

In popular culture 
In 2018, Felix van Groeningen adapted Sheff's book Beautiful Boy into a feature film of the same name. In the film, Sheff is portrayed by Steve Carell, with Timothée Chalamet as his son, Nic. Actress Maura Tierney portrays David's wife, artist Karen Barbour, and Amy Ryan plays Nic's mother, Vicki.

References

External links 
 
 "My Addicted Son" by David Sheff – New York Times article that preceded his full-length memoir, Beautiful Boy.

American male non-fiction writers
Writers from Boston
Living people
University of California, Berkeley alumni
American memoirists
Writers on addiction
American people of Russian-Jewish descent
Jewish American writers
1955 births
21st-century American Jews